John Christopher Armitage  (born 20 December 1959) is a British-Irish billionaire hedge fund manager, the chief investment officer and a co-founder of Egerton Capital.

According to The Sunday Times Rich List in 2019, Armitage is worth £600 million.

Early life
John Christopher Armitage was born on 20 December 1959. He earned a degree in modern history from Pembroke College, Cambridge in 1981.

Career
Armitage joined Morgan Grenfell in 1981, and was a director of Morgan Grenfell Asset Management from March 1991 until he left in 1994.

Armitage and William Bollinger co-founded Egerton Capital in 1994. Armitage is the chief investment officer.

In 2006, Armitage became a member of the investment board of the University of Cambridge.

In the year to 31 March 2014, Egerton made a profit of £141.4 million, which was divided between its 12 partners. At the end of 2017, Egerton had $18.8 billion in assets under management.

Personal life
Armitage lives in London, England. He is married to Catherine Armitage.

In May 2017, he gave £500,000 to the Conservative Party. In 2022, Armitage left the Conservative Party and began donating to the Labour Party, with donations also made to the party leader Keir Starmer and Wes Streeting, the Shadow Health Secretary. 

In 2018, he acquired Irish citizenship. In February 2018, he purchased a Park Avenue, New York apartment for US$18 million.

References

Living people
British hedge fund managers
1959 births
Alumni of Pembroke College, Cambridge
Commanders of the Order of the British Empire
Conservative Party (UK) donors
Labour Party (UK) donors
British billionaires
Irish billionaires
British emigrants to Ireland
Irish financial businesspeople
Naturalised citizens of Ireland
Chief investment officers